Rafael Pimentel (1855 – July 31, 1929) was a Mexican lawyer and politician. He was born in Oaxaca de Juarez in the state of Oaxaca. He was Governor of Chihuahua (1892) and Governor of Chiapas (1899–1905).

References

Bibliography
ALMADA, Francisco R. (1980). Gobernadores del Estado de Chihuahua. Chihuahua: Centro Librero La Prensa.
ALTAMIRANO, Graziella y VILLA, Guadalupe (1988). Chihuahua: una historia compartida 1824-1921. México, D.F.: Gobierno del Estado de Chihuahua, Instituto de Investigaciones Dr. José María Luis Mora, Universidad Autónoma de Ciudad Juárez. .

1855 births
1929 deaths
19th-century Mexican lawyers
Governors of Chihuahua (state)
Governors of Chiapas
People from Oaxaca City
Politicians from Oaxaca
19th-century Mexican politicians
20th-century Mexican politicians